The thirteenth season of the American reality talent show The Voice premiered on September 25, 2017, on NBC. Adam Levine and Blake Shelton returned for their thirteenth season as coaches. Meanwhile, Miley Cyrus returned after a one-season absence replacing Gwen Stefani, and new coach Jennifer Hudson joined the panel replacing Alicia Keys.

Chloe Kohanski was announced as the winner of the season, marking Blake Shelton's sixth win as a coach, & making her the third stolen artist to win, following Josh Kaufman in season six and Craig Wayne Boyd in season seven. For the first time, the Top 3 artists were all female and originally belonged to the same team (Miley’s).

Coaches and hosts

The coach lineup changed once again for the thirteenth season. Gwen Stefani and Alicia Keys did not return as coaches. They were replaced by Miley Cyrus, who returned after a one-season hiatus, along with returning coaches Adam Levine and Blake Shelton. On May 10, 2017, NBC announced that Jennifer Hudson would join as a coach, following her success on The Voice UK, Alicia Keys returned for Season 14 in the spring of 2018. Carson Daly returned for his thirteenth season as host.

This season, for the first time since season six, the Playoffs did not kick off the live rounds and voting. Instead, the Top 12 were chosen by the coaches. In previous seasons, the finalists were partially determined by viewers’ votes.

This season's Battle advisors were: Joe Jonas for Team Adam, Kelly Rowland for Team Jennifer, Billy Ray Cyrus for Team Miley, Rascal Flatts for Team Blake. Kelly Clarkson was a key advisor for all of the teams.

Teams

Color key

Blind auditions
Color key

Episode 1 (Sept. 25)

Episode 2 (Sept. 26)

Episode 3 (Oct. 2)

Episode 4 (Oct. 3)

Episode 5 (Oct. 9)

Episode 6 (Oct. 10)

The Battles

The Battle Rounds began on October 16. Season thirteen's advisors were Joe Jonas for Team Adam, Kelly Rowland for Team Jennifer, Billy Ray Cyrus for Team Miley, and Rascal Flatts for Team Blake. Like previous Battles, coaches can steal any two losing artists from another coach.

Color key:

The Knockouts
The Knockouts round starts with episode 11. The coaches can each steal one losing artist. The top 20 contestants then move on to The Playoffs. Kelly Clarkson served as the advisor for the Knockouts.

Color key:

1 Whitney Fenimore is on Team Adam for the Playoffs.

The Playoffs
The Playoffs were taped on August 31 and September 1, and comprised episodes 15, 16, and 17. As in season six and for the first time since season ten, the Playoffs were prerecorded and hence no interactive viewer voting component or subsequent results shows. As in seasons 9, 10, and 12, four previously eliminated artists were chosen by the coaches to come back for the Playoffs.

This season is the first to have the Playoffs taped on the same stage as the Battles and the Knockouts. There was no public vote in the playoffs. Instead, each of the coaches selected three of their own artists to eliminate.

Color key:

Live shows
Color key:

Week 1: Top 12 (Nov 20 & 21)
The Top 12 performed on Monday, November 20, 2017, with the results following on Tuesday, November 21, 2017. The Instant Save returned once again this season, with the bottom two artists performing for a spot in the next round via the viewers' votes from Twitter.

iTunes bonuses this week was awarded to Addison Agen (#9).

In addition, the show's official YouTube channel released a video starring the cast of Pitch Perfect 3 and the Top 12 singing "Freedom! '90" and "Cups".

Week 2: Top 11 (Nov 27 & 28)
The Top 11 performed songs chosen by the public on Monday, November 27, 2017, with the results following on Tuesday, November 28, 2017. iTunes bonus multipliers were awarded to Red Marlow (#9), Agen (#2), and Chloe Kohanski (#1).

Week 3: Top 10 (Dec 4 & 5)
The Top 10 performed on Monday, December 4, 2017, with the results following on Tuesday, December 5, 2017. iTunes bonus multipliers were awarded to Keisha Renee (#10), Agen (#5), Kohanski (#4), and Brooke Simpson (#2).

Week 4: Semifinals (Dec 11 & 12)
The Top 8 performed on Monday, December 11, 2017, with the results following on Tuesday, December 12, 2017. Like Season 12, the duets between contestants were part of the competition and public voting. In the semifinals, three artists will automatically move to next week's finale, the two artists with the fewest votes will be immediately eliminated and the middle three will contend for the remaining spot in the next week's finals via the Instant Save. iTunes bonuses this week awarded to Kohanski (#1), Agen (#2), Red Marlow (#5), Brooke Simpson (#6) and Noah Mac (#7), as well as the duet for Kohanski and Mac (#3). Davon Fleming's "Gravity" was in the Top 10 earlier Tuesday, but it had fallen to #11 by the voting deadline.

With the eliminations of Mac and Davon Fleming, with the former being the first artist to receive two iTunes bonuses and to be eliminated during the same week, Hudson no longer has any artists remaining on her team.

Week 5: Finale (Dec 18 & 19)
The Top 4 performed on Monday, December 18, 2017, with the final results following on Tuesday, December 19, 2017. This week, the four finalists performed a solo cover song, a duet with their coach, and an original song. iTunes bonuses this week were awarded to Agen (#1 and #5), Kohanski (#2 and #7), Marlow (#3 and #10) and Simpson (#4 and #8). For the first time in The Voice history, the Top three (of the final four) artists were all female. All finalists in the Top 3 were originally members of Team Miley and this was the first season in which both of the top 2 artists were stolen artists. Agen would also be the last artist Levine would take to the Finale as he did not get any other finalists through the rest of his coaching tenure.

Elimination chart

Overall
Color key 
Artist's info

Result details

Team
Color key
Artist's info

Result details

Reception

U.S. Nielsen ratings

References

External links

Season 13
2017 American television seasons